WISE 1828+2650 (full designation WISEPA J182831.08+265037.8) is a possibly binary brown dwarf or rogue planet of spectral class >Y2, located in constellation Lyra at approximately 32.5 light-years from Earth. It is the "archetypal member" of the Y spectral class.

History of observations

Discovery 

WISE 1828+2650 was discovered in 2011 from data collected by NASA's 40 cm (16 in) Wide-field Infrared Survey Explorer (WISE) space telescope at infrared wavelength. WISE 1828+2650 has two discovery papers: Kirkpatrick et al. (2011) and Cushing et al. (2011), however, basically with the same authors and published nearly simultaneously.

Kirkpatrick et al. presented discovery of 98 new found by WISE brown dwarf systems with components of spectral types M, L, T and Y, among which also was WISE 1828+2650 – coolest of them.
Cushing et al. presented discovery of seven brown dwarfs – one of T9.5 type, and six of Y-type – first members of the Y spectral class, ever discovered and spectroscopically confirmed, including "archetypal member" of the Y spectral class – WISE 1828+2650. These seven objects are also the faintest seven of 98 brown dwarfs, presented in Kirkpatrick et al. (2011).

Distance 

Proper motion 

WISE 1828+2650 has a proper motion of  milliarcseconds per year.

Physical properties 

Until the discovery of WISE 0855−0714 in 2014 WISE 1828+2650 was considered as the coldest currently known brown dwarf or the first example of free-floating planet (it is not currently known if it is a brown dwarf or a free-floating planet). It has been assigned the latest known spectral class (>Y2, initially estimated as >Y0).

The mass of WISE 1828+2650 is in the range  for ages of 0.1–10 Gyr.

WISE 1828+2650 is similar in appearance to the other Y-type object WD 0806-661 B. WD 0806-661 B could have formed as a planet close to its primary, WD 0806-661 A, and later, when the primary became a white dwarf and lost most of its mass, have migrated into a larger orbit of 2500 AU, and similarity between WD 0806-661 B and WISE 1828+2650 may indicate that WISE 1828+2650 had formed in the same way.

Possible binarity 

Comparison between WISE 1828+2650 and WD 0806-661 B may suggest that WISE 1828+2650 is a system of two equal-mass objects. Observations with Hubble Space Telescope (HST) and Keck-II LGS-AO system had not revealed binarity, suggesting that if any such companion exists, it would have an orbit less than 0.5 AU, and no direct evidence for binarity yet exists.

Comparison

See also 

The other six discoveries of brown dwarfs, published by Cushing et al. in 2011:
WISE 0148−7202 (T9.5)
WISE 0410+1502 (Y0)
WISE 1405+5534 (Y0 (pec?))
WISE 1541−2250 (Y0.5)
WISE 1738+2732 (Y0)
WISE 2056+1459 (Y0)

Notes

References

External links 

NASA news release
Science news

Solstation.com (New Objects within 20 light-years)

Brown dwarfs
Rogue planets
Y-type stars
Lyra (constellation)
20110901
WISE objects